Hames is a part of a horse harness.

Surnames 
Hames may refer to:
 Bob Hames (1920–1998), American jazz guitarist
 Chaim (Harvey) Hames (born 1966), professor of history and Rector at Ben-Gurion University of the Negev
 Duncan Hames (born 1977), British Liberal Democrat politician
 Greg Hames (born 1980), English cricketer
 Jagan Hames (born 1975), retired Australian decathlete
Jordan Hames
 Kim Hames (born 1953), Australian politician
 Mat Hames (born 1971), American independent filmmaker
 Michael Hames, Metropolitan Police Detective Superintendent
 Tim Hames, British journalist

Other uses
Hames Valley AVA, a California wine region